Rhys Bozinovski (born 7 March 2004), is an Australian professional soccer player who plays as a central midfielder for Western United.

Personal life
His grandfather is former Malta captain Willie Vassallo.

References

External links

2004 births
Living people
Australian soccer players
Association football midfielders
Melbourne City FC players
Western United FC players
National Premier Leagues players
A-League Men players
Australian people of Maltese descent
Australian people of Macedonian descent